Carlitinhos is a 1921 Brazilian short film comedy directed by José Medina.

Cast
José Vassalo Jr.
Carlos Ferreira
Antônio Degani

External links

References

1921 films
Brazilian black-and-white films
1921 short films
Brazilian silent short films
1921 comedy films
Comedy short films
Brazilian comedy films
Silent comedy films